Events from the year 2002 in the United Arab Emirates.

Incumbents
President: Zayed bin Sultan Al Nahyan 
Prime Minister: Maktoum bin Rashid Al Maktoum

Establishments
 Kinshasa Airways.
 Dubai Fencing Club.

External links
2002 in the United Arab Emirates - Snipview

 
Years of the 21st century in the United Arab Emirates
United Arab Emirates
United Arab Emirates
2010s in the United Arab Emirates